James Wilson (3 June 1805 – 11 August 1860) was a Scottish businessman, economist, and Liberal politician who founded The Economist weekly and the Chartered Bank of India, Australia and China, which merged with Standard Bank in 1969 to form Standard Chartered. He was the first Finance Member of the Viceroy's Executive Council from December 1859 until his death in August 1860. Sent there to put order into the chaos that followed the "Sepoy Mutiny" of 1857, he presented India's first budget, and was responsible for the government accounting system, Pay Office, and audit, apart from government paper currency, Indian Police, a Military Finance Commission, and a Civil Finance Commission.

Early life 
Wilson was born in Hawick in the Scottish Borders. His Quaker father William Wilson owned a hat manufactury, and his ancestors were local sheep farmers. He was the fourth of fifteen children, of whom ten reached adulthood. His mother died when James was young.

A successful disciplined autodidact scholar from a Quaker family, he was destined to be a schoolmaster but hated it so much that he "would rather to be the most menial servant in [his] father's mill". After considering studying law with a view to becoming an advocate, a profession which would have meant abandoning his family religion, Wilson decided instead to learn business, and at the age of sixteen became an apprentice in a hat factory. Later, his father bought the business for him and his elder brother, William. When James Wilson was nineteen, the brothers left Scotland and migrated to London, with a gift of £2,000 each, .

Career

Business 
The brothers established a manufacturing factory—Wilson, Irwin & Wilson—that they dissolved in 1831. Wilson continued in the same line of business with much success (his net worth was £25,000 in 1837, . During the economic crisis of 1837, he lost most of his wealth when the price of indigo fell. By 1839, he had sold most of his property and avoided bankruptcy. However, in 1853 he founded the Chartered Bank of India, Australia and China, which later merged with the Standard Bank to form Standard Chartered Bank in 1969.

Journalism 
Wilson was generally opposed to privileging the Church of England, the secret ballot when it was proposed in 1853, and the Corn Laws. He wrote a pamphlet titled Influences of the Corn Laws, as affecting all classes of the community, and particularly the landed interests. It slowly received positive feedback and Wilson's fame had grown. He then went on writing on currency, and especially The Revenue; or, What should the Chancellor do?. He started to write for newspapers, including the Manchester Guardian. In 1843 he established The Economist as a newspaper to campaign for free trade, and acted as Chief editor and sole proprietor for sixteen years. His overarching goal to end vested interests in the Westminster parliament wherever these led to poverty or starvation, as the Corn Laws most notably had done. An article Wilson published in April 1848 in opposition to the Ten Hours Bill was criticised by Karl Marx for misunderstanding profit and the working day. The Economist is still published today, now with a weekly circulation of over 1.6 million globally. Wilson was the most respected statistician of his times and saw economics as an optimistic and rational way of mediating socially sustainable futures drawing on the Scottish School of Adam Smith and the French "Entrepreneur" School of Jean-Baptiste Say.

Politics 
Wilson entered the House of Commons as Liberal Member of Parliament for Westbury, Wiltshire, in 1847. Because of his economic experience, in 1848 prime minister Lord John Russell appointed Wilson as Secretary of the Board of Control, which supervised the East India Company's control of British India, a post he held until the government fell in 1852. He then served as Financial Secretary to the Treasury between 1853 and 1858, firstly in Lord Aberdeen's coalition government and secondly in Lord Palmerston's first administration. In 1857 he was returned to Parliament for Devonport. He again briefly held office under Palmerston as Paymaster-General and Vice-President of the Board of Trade between June and August 1859 and was sworn of the Privy Council the same year.

In August 1859 Wilson resigned these offices and his seat in parliament to sit as the financial member of the Council of India. He was sent by Queen Victoria to India to establish the tax structure, a new paper currency, and remodel India's finance system after the Rebellion of 1857. However, he was in office only a year before he died. In 1860 he refused to leave the stifling summer heat of Calcutta, contracted dysentery, and died in August of that year at age 55.

Despite his prominent public role, Wilson was buried unknown at a cemetery at Mullick Bazar in Kolkata. His grave was discovered in 2007 by CP Bhatia, a joint commissioner of Income Tax, while researching a book on India's tax history. Due to the efforts of CP Bhatia the tombstone was restored by the Christian Burial Board.

Family 
Wilson married Elizabeth Preston of Newcastle-upon-Tyne in January 1832. They had six daughters, of whom Eliza, the eldest, married Walter Bagehot.

Works 
Influences of the corn laws, as affecting all classes of the community, and particularly the landed interests
Fluctuations of currency, commerce, and manufactures : referable to the corn laws

References

External links 
 
 
 
 

1805 births
1860 deaths
19th-century publishers (people)
19th-century Scottish businesspeople
People from Hawick
Anglo-Scots
British business and financial journalists
British milliners
Liberal Party (UK) MPs for English constituencies
Members of the Privy Council of the United Kingdom
Scottish bankers
Scottish economists
Scottish journalists
Scottish magazine editors
Scottish magazine publishers (people)
Scottish politicians
Scottish Quakers
The Economist editors
UK MPs 1847–1852
UK MPs 1852–1857
UK MPs 1857–1859
United Kingdom Paymasters General
19th-century British journalists
British male journalists
Standard Chartered people
Members of the Parliament of the United Kingdom for constituencies in Devon
Politicians from Plymouth, Devon